The 2010 Rally Estonia (formally known as the Mad-Croc Rally Estonia 2010) was a motor racing event for rally cars that was held over three days between 16 and 18 July 2010. It was the inaugural running of Rally Estonia. The event consisted of twelve special stages totalling  in competitive kilometres. The stages were run on smooth gravel roads of Southern Estonia. 

Local hero Markko Märtin (co-driver Kristo Kraag) was dominant as he won all twelve stages driving a Ford Focus RS WRC 03. Rising star Ott Tänak (co-driver Kuldar Sikk) finished second on his Subaru Impreza STi N14. Finnish driver Toni Gardemeister (co-driver Tapio Suominen) completed the podium driving a Ford Fiesta S2000.

Report

Classification

Special stages

References

External links
 The official website of Rally Estonia

Rally Estonia
2010 in Estonian sport
July 2010 sports events in Europe